Electus Comfort (1826June 12, 1894) was a 19th-century Sandy Hook pilot, in active pilot service for 42 years. He was known as the "Beau Brummell of the Sea". He was the captain for the 19th-century Sandy Hook pilot boat Joseph F. Loubat,  No. 16.

Early life

Comfort married Mary Mead. They had two children, Sarah F. Comfort born in 1850 and Emma L. Comfort born in 1860, both from New York. Mary died on March 27, 1907.

Career

Comfort started as pilot in 1851 and was in active service for 42 years. He was registered as captain of the pilot boat Christian Bergh and the Joseph F. Loubat, No. 16, that were owned by Comfort and other New York pilots.

As part-owner of the Loubat pilot boat, Comfort was invited to assist in the ceremonies of the launch at the Jacob S. Ellis's shipyard in Tottenville, Staten Island, on Saturday, December 18, 1880. The launch consisted of the four owners, a large number of pilots and their families and friends. Captain Comfort would be in command of the J. F. Loubat.

Comfort was also Master of the pilot-boat Christian Bergh, that was built in 1851, by Aaron J. Westervelt at the Westervelt & Co. shipyard in New York City .

His well-dressed appearance was typical of some of the New York pilots as a way to show their wealth. He wore a silk top hat, frock coat, boiled shirt and a bow tie. He had gray whiskers and smoked a cigar.

Comfort was elected Treasurer of the New York Sandy Hook Pilots' Charitable Fund on February 8, 1893. The charitable fund provided pensions to pilots, burials, etc. Another notable officer elected was Captain Walter Brewer as Secretary. Comfort was also a trustee of the Charitable Fund, that in 1894, supported 29 widows, 14 children, and 4 men.

Death

Comfort died on June 12, 1894, in Brooklyn, New York at age 69. Funeral services were at his residence, 465 Lexington Avenue, Brooklyn. At the time of his death he was a member of the John D. Willard Lodge, No. 250, F and A.

See also

List of Northeastern U. S. Pilot Boats

References

External links
 The Sandy Hook Pilots website

1826 births
1894 deaths
Sea captains
Maritime pilotage
People from Brooklyn